F. E. Osborne Junior High School is a public junior high school in Calgary, Alberta. It serves the communities of Hawkwood, Varsity, Sage Hill, Silver Springs, and Montgomery. It has a total enrollment of 726 students. Its students are primarily in grades 7-9, but its early French immersion program goes from grades 6-9.

The school is named after former Calgary mayor and alderman Frederick Ernest Osborne.

Facilities
Gymnasium
Music Room
Woodworking
Library
3 Science Labs
Foods/cooking room
Cafeteria/Lunchroom
Fitness Room
Art Room
Guidance Counseller and Medical Room
2 Computer Labs

Extra curricular

Clubs

The clubs at F.E. Osborne are, among others:
Art Club
Debate Team
Yearbook
Model UN
Leadership (School Dances, Fundraisers, Intramurals etc.)
Band
Tour band
GSA (Gay-straight Alliance)
Book Club
GEM Club (Girls Excel in Math)
Improv Club

Athletics
The team's name is the F.E. Osborne Eagles and their jersey colours are mainly red and white.

Teams
Junior and Senior Girls Volleyball
Junior and Senior Boys Volleyball
Junior and Senior Girls Basketball
Junior and Senior Boys Basketball
Girls Soccer
Boys Soccer
Cross Country Running Team
Badminton
Track and Field

References

External links
Calgary Board of Education: F.E. Osborne Junior High School

Middle schools in Calgary
Educational institutions established in 1967
1967 establishments in Alberta